Gnaeus Pompeius Magnus (29 September 106 BC – 28 September 48 BC), known in English as Pompey  or Pompey the Great, was a leading Roman general and statesman. He played a significant role in the transformation of Rome from republic to empire. Early in his career, he was a partisan and protégé of the Roman general and dictator Sulla; later, he became the political ally, and finally the enemy, of Julius Caesar. 

A member of the senatorial nobility, Pompey entered into a military career while still young. He rose to prominence serving the dictator Sulla as a commander in the civil war of 83–82 BC. Pompey's success as a general while young enabled him to advance directly to his first Roman consulship without following the traditional cursus honorum (the required steps to advance in a political career). He was elected as Roman consul on three occasions (70, 55, 52 BC). He celebrated three Roman triumphs, served as a commander in the Sertorian War, the Third Servile War, the Third Mithridatic War, and in various other military campaigns. Pompey's early success earned him the cognomen Magnus – "the Great" – after his boyhood hero Alexander the Great. His adversaries gave him the nickname adulescentulus carnifex ("teenage butcher") for his ruthlessness.

In 60 BC, Pompey joined Crassus and Caesar in the informal political alliance known as the First Triumvirate, cemented by Pompey's marriage with Caesar's daughter, Julia. After the deaths of Julia and Crassus (in 54 and 53 BC), Pompey switched to the political faction known as the optimates— a conservative faction of the Roman Senate. Pompey and Caesar then began contending for leadership of the Roman state in its entirety, eventually leading to Caesar's Civil War. Pompey was defeated at the Battle of Pharsalus in 48 BC, and he sought refuge in Ptolemaic Egypt, where he was assassinated by the courtiers of Ptolemy XIII.

Early life and career

Pompey was born on 29 September 106 BC, son of a provincial noble called Gnaeus Pompeius Strabo. Although the dominant family in Picenum, Strabo was the first to achieve senatorial status in Rome. He completed the traditional cursus honorum, becoming consul in 89 BC, and acquired a reputation for greed, political duplicity, and military ruthlessness. Pompey began his career serving with his father in the Social War (91–87 BC). 

Strabo died in 87 BC during the short-lived civil war known as the Bellum Octavianum, although sources differ on whether he succumbed to disease, or was murdered by his own soldiers. Prior to his death, Strabo was accused of embezzlement; as his legal heir, Pompey was held responsible for the alleged crime and put on trial. He was acquitted, supposedly after agreeing to marry the judge's daughter, Antistia.

One of the issues at stake in 87 BC was Sulla's appointment as commander of Roman troops in the First Mithridatic War, an opportunity to amass enormous wealth. During his absence in Asia Minor, political rivals led by Cinna, Carbo and Gaius Marius the Younger regained control of the Senate. 

Sulla's return in 84 BC initiated a new round of civil war, while Pompey raised levies from Picenum in his support. By 82 BC, Sulla had expelled his opponents from Italy, and engineered his nomination as Dictator by the Roman Senate. Either through admiration of his abilities, or concern at his ambition, Sulla persuaded Pompey to divorce Antistia, and marry his stepdaughter Aemilia. Plutarch claims she was already pregnant by her former husband, and died in childbirth soon after.

Sicily, Africa and Lepidus' rebellion
The surviving Marians escaped to Sicily, where their ally Marcus Perperna was propraetor. They were supported by a fleet under Carbo, while Ahenobarbus occupied the Roman province of Africa. Perperna abandoned Sicily after Pompey landed on the island with a large force, while Carbo was captured and later executed. Pompey claimed this was justified by Carbo's alleged crimes against Roman citizens, but his opponents nicknamed him adulescentulus carnifex, or "young butcher", as a result.  

Pompey now sailed for Africa, leaving Sicily in the hands of his brother-in-law, Gaius Memmius. After defeating and killing Ahenobarbus at Utica, Pompey subdued Numidia and executed its king Hiarbas, a Marian ally. Around this time, his troops began referring to him as Magnus, or "the Great", after Alexander the Great, a figure much admired by the Romans. Shortly thereafter, Pompey formally made this part of his name.     

On returning to Rome, he asked for a triumph to celebrate his victories, an unprecedented demand for someone so young. Pompey refused to disband his army until Sulla agreed, although the latter tried to offset the impact by awarding simultaneous triumphs to Lucius Murena and Gaius Flaccus. Sometime during this period, Pompey married Mucia Tertia, a member of the powerful Metellus family. They had three children before their divorce in 61 BC; Pompey the younger, usually known as Gnaeus, a daughter, Pompeia Magna, and a younger son, Sextus.

  

Pompey supported Marcus Aemilius Lepidus as consul for 78 BC; Plutarch claims he did so against Sulla's advice, but most modern historians refute the idea. When Sulla died in 78 BC, Lepidus sought to block his state funeral and assumed leadership of the populares, then became proconsul of Cisalpine and Transalpine Gaul in January 77 BC. When the Senate ordered him back to Rome, Lepidus refused to comply unless granted another term as consul, a proposal that was rapidly rejected. Assembling an army, he began marching on Rome; the Senate responded with a series of measures, one of which was to appoint Pompey to a military command.

While Lepidus continued south, Pompey raised troops from among his veterans in Picenum, and moved north to besiege Mutina, capital of Cisalpine Gaul. The town was held by Lepidus' ally Marcus Junius Brutus, who surrendered after a lengthy siege, and was assassinated next day, allegedly on Pompey's orders. Catulus then defeated Lepidus outside Rome, while Pompey marched against his rear, catching him near Cosa. Lepidus and the remnants of his army retreated to Sardinia, where he died.

Sertorian War and first consulship

Sertorian War

The Sertorian War began in 80 BC when Quintus Sertorius initiated a rebellion in Hispania, where he was joined by other Marian survivors like Perpenna. Supported by local tribes, he took control of Hispania Citerior, then forced Quintus Caecilius Metellus Pius out of neighbouring Hispania Ulterior. In order to retrieve the situation, allies in the Senate secured Pompey an appointment as military commander in Spain with proconsular authority. This act was technically illegal as he had yet to hold public office, illustrating Pompey's preference for military glory, and disregard for traditional political constraints.

Pompey recruited 30,000 infantry and 1,000 cavalry, evidence of the threat posed by Sertorius. En route to Hispania, he subdued a rebellion in Gallia Narbonensis, after which his army entered winter quarters near Narbo Martius. In early 76 BC, he crossed the Col de Portet and entered the Iberian peninsula,  where he would remain for the next five years. His arrival boosted the morale of Metellus' troops, while some rebel groups changed sides, but he was then defeated by Sertorius at the Battle of Lauron. This was a serious blow to Pompey's prestige, who spent the rest of the year re-organising his army.

    

In 75 BC, Sertorius led the campaign against Metellus, while Pompey smashed his subordinates Perpenna and Gaius Herennius outside Valencia. When Sertorius took charge of operations against Pompey, Metellus defeated his deputy Lucius Hirtuleius at the Battle of Italica. After the indecisive Battle of Sucro, Sertorius withdrew inland, then turned to fight at Saguntum, where Pompey lost 6,000 killed, including his brother-in-law Gaius Memmius, reputedly his most effective subordinate. Sertorius himself suffered 3,000 casualties, one of whom was Hirtuleius. 

Although Metellus defeated Perpenna in a separate battle, Sertorius was able to withdraw to Clunia, where he repaired the walls to lure his opponents into a siege, while forming garrisons from other towns into a new field army. Once this was ready, he escaped from Clunia and used it to disrupt Roman logistics on land and by sea. Lack of supplies forced Metellus to quarter his troops in Gaul, while Pompey wintered among the Vaccaei. 

Reinforced by two more legions, in 73 BC Metellus joined Pompey and made for the river Ebro, while Sertorius and Perpenna advanced from Lusitania. By now, Sertorius was being undermined by internal divisions, allegedly encouraged by Perpenna. Metellus took advantage to re-take many rebel towns, although neither side made much progress until 71 BC when Perpenna murdered and replaced Sertorius. He was then defeated and executed by Pompey, who remained in Spain to quell the last disorders, showing a talent for organisation and lack of animosity which extended his patronage throughout Hispania and into southern Gaul.

First Consulship
During Pompey's absence in Hispania from 73 to 71 BC, Crassus was charged with suppressing the slave rebellion led by Spartacus known as the Third Servile War. Pompey returned to Italy just before Crassus defeated the main rebel army, arriving in time to massacre 6,000 fugitives from the battle. His claim to have ended the war by doing so was bitterly resented by Crassus.

Pompey was granted a second triumph for his victory in Hispania, and nominated for the consulship. Since he was both too young and technically ineligible, this required a special senatorial decree. Plutarch suggests Pompey supported Crassus as his co-consul in order to put him under an obligation. The two men were elected consuls for 70 BC, but allegedly differed on almost every measure, rendering their term "politically barren and without achievement." 

However, their consulship did see the plebeian tribune recover powers removed by Sulla. One of the most significant was the ability to veto Senatorial bills, an act often seen as a turning point in the politics of the late Republic. Highly popular with the people, the measure must have been opposed by the optimates, and thus passing it required support from both consuls, although most extant sources barely mention Crassus.

Campaign against the pirates
Pirates operated throughout the Mediterranean, while their fleets often formed temporary alliances with enemies of Rome, including Sertorius and Mithridates. Their power and range had increased over the past fifty years, partly because of the decline of traditional naval powers like Rhodes, while previous attempts to subdue them had been unsuccessful. However, Romans routinely referred to their opponents as "pirates" or "brigands", and some historians argue it is more accurate to see them as a conventional enemy, rather than disorganised outlaws. 

Principally based in Cilicia, in 68 BC they raided as far as Ostia, Rome's port, and kidnapped two senators, to general outrage.  Prompted by Pompey, Aulus Gabinius, tribune of the plebs in 67 BC, proposed the Lex Gabinia,  giving him a mandate for their suppression. It granted him proconsular authority for three years in any province within 50 miles of the Mediterranean, along with the power to appoint legates and significant financial resources. Concerned by one man holding such wide-ranging powers, the law was opposed by the Senate, but passed by the tribunate. Most of the difficulties Pompey faced came from officials who resented his authority. In Gaul, Piso hampered his recruitment efforts, while in Crete, Quintus Metellus refused to comply with his instructions.

Pompey spread his forces throughout the Mediterranean to prevent the pirates escaping a Roman fleet by moving elsewhere. Fifteen legates were given specific areas to patrol, while he secured the grain route to Rome. These measures won him control of the western Mediterranean in just 40 days, after which his fleets moved to the east, forcing the pirates back to their bases in Cilicia. Pompey led the decisive assault on their stronghold in Alanya, winning the Battle of Korakesion and concluding the war in only three months. 

Most of his opponents surrendered without fighting, thanks to Pompey's reputation for clemency. They were granted lands in cities devastated during the Mithridatic War, notably Soli, renamed Pompeiopolis, and Dyme in Greece, with others sent to towns in Libya and Calabria. These communities retained a strong attachment to both Rome and Pompey.

The Third Mithridatic War, and Re-Organisation of the East

Third Mithridatic War 

In 73 BC, Lucius Licinius Lucullus, formerly one of Sulla's chief lieutenants, was made proconsul of Cilicia, and commander in the Third Mithridatic War. This began when the last ruler of Bithynia died in 74 BC and left his kingdom to Rome, sparking an invasion by  Mithridates VI of  Pontus, and Tigranes the Great of Armenia. Lucullus was a skilled general who won numerous victories, but claims he was protracting the war for "power and wealth" led to a Senate investigation, while by 69 BC his troops were weary and mutinous.

In 68 BC, Quintus Marcius Rex replaced Lucullus in Cicilia, while  Manius Acilius Glabrio received Bithynia. He also assumed leadership of the war against Mithridates, but failed to respond decisively when the latter re-occupied much of Pontus in 67 BC, then attacked Cappadocia, a Roman ally. Seeing an opportunity, in 66 BC Pompey used the tribunate to pass the lex Manilia, giving him extensive powers throughout Asia Minor in order to defeat Mithridates, in addition to those granted by the lex Gabinia. The optimates were privately horrified that one man should hold so much influence, but fearful of his popularity allowed the measure to pass. 

Incensed at being replaced, Lucullus called Pompey a "vulture" who profited from the work of others, a reference both to his new command and claim to have finished the war against Spartacus. Pompey agreed an alliance with Phraates III, king of Parthia, whom he persuaded to invade Armenia. When Mithridates offered a truce, Lucullus argued the war was over, but Pompey demanded concessions which could not be accepted. Outnumbered, Mithridates withdrew into Armenia, followed by Pompey, who defeated him at Lycus near the end of 66 BC.   

According to contemporary sources, Mithridates and a small contingent escaped the battle, outstripped their pursuers, and reached Colchis on the Black Sea. While there, he took control of the Cimmerian Bosporus from its Roman-backed ruler, his son Machares, who later committed suicide. Meanwhile, Pompey invaded Armenia supported by Tigranes the Younger, whose father quickly came to terms; in return for the restoration of Armenian territories taken by Lucullus, he paid a substantial cash indemnity  and allowed Roman troops to be based on his territory.

In 65 BC, Pompey set out to take Colchis, but to do so had first to subdue various local tribes and allies of Mithridrates. After winning a series of battles, he reached Phasis and linked up with Servilius, admiral of his Euxine fleet, before a fresh revolt in Caucasian Albania forced him to retrace his steps. Victory at the Abas enabled him to impose terms on the Albanians and agree truces with other tribes on the northern side of the Caucasus. Pompey then wintered in Armenia, settling minor border contests and raids between his allies Phraates and Tigranes. 

Relying on his naval blockade to wear down Mithridates, Pompey spent 64 BC annexing the independent and wealthy cities of Syria, which were incorporated into a new Roman province. In the process, he acquired large amounts of money and prestige, as well as criticism from his opponents in Rome, who argued doing so exceeded his authority. Meanwhile, an ageing Mithridates had been cornered in Panticapaeum by another of his sons, Pharnaces II of Pontus. An attempt to commit suicide by taking poison allegedly failed due to his habit of taking "precautionary antidotes", and he was killed by the rebels. Pharnaces sent his embalmed body to Pompey, in return for which he was granted the Bosporan Kingdom and made an ally of Rome.

Re-organisation of the East
The final collapse of the Seleucid Empire allowed Pompey to annex Syria in 64 BC, but its dissolution destabilised the region, while many of its cities had used the power vacuum to achieve independence. In early 63 BC, Pompey left Antioch and marched south, occupying coastal cities like Apamea, before crossing the Anti-Lebanon Mountains and capturing Pella, Jordan and Damascus.

 

Further south, Judea was disrupted by the Hasmonean Civil War, in which Pompey backed Hyrcanus II over his brother Aristobulus II. When he compelled the latter to surrender Jerusalem, its defenders took refuge in the Temple, which the Romans first stormed, then looted. Judea became a client kingdom ruled by Hyrcanus, while its northern section was incorporated into the Decapolis, a league of semi-autonomous cities (see Map). Both Judea and the League were made subordinate to the new province of Syria.

Other organisational changes included creating the province of Bithynia and Pontus, with the rest of Mithridates' territories distributed among Roman allies. Elsewhere, Ariobarzanes I of Cappadocia was restored to his throne, while Lesser Armenia was taken from Tigranes and incorporated into Galatia, with Pompey's client Deiotarus becoming ruler of the new kingdom. Finally, Cilicia received the coastal region of Pamphylia, previously a centre of piracy, along with other inland areas and reorganised into six parts. These actions significantly increased Roman state income and presented Pompey with multiple opportunities to increase his personal wealth and patronage base.

Return to Rome and the First Triumvirate

Before his return to Italy in 62 BC, Pompey paid his troops bonuses totalling around 16,000 talents,   but despite fears he intended to follow Sulla's example, they were dismissed upon arrival at Brundisium. His journey to Rome drew huge crowds wherever he stopped, showing that although opinion in the Senate was divided, Pompey remained as popular as ever with the masses. He was awarded a third triumph for his achievements in Asia Minor, celebrated on his 45th birthday in 61 BC. 

Pompey claimed the new provinces established in the East had increased annual state income from 200 million to 340 million sesterces, plus an additional payment of 480 million sesterces to the treasury. He refused to provide details of his personal fortune, but given the amounts declared publicly, this must have been enormous. Some of it was used to build one of the most famous structures of Ancient Rome, the Theatre of Pompey.

However, the Senate then refused to ratify the treaties agreed by Pompey as part of his settlement of the East. Opposition was led by the optimates Cato the Younger and Metellus Celer, whose sister Mucia had recently been divorced by Pompey, for reasons still disputed.  They also defeated a bill to distribute farmland to his veterans, and landless members of the urban poor. A similar measure had been rejected in 63 BC, which arguably made the Senate over confident in their ability to control popular unrest. 

Although Pompey could not overcome optimate opposition on his own, the situation changed when Marius' nephew Julius Caesar sought his endorsement for the consulship in 59 BC. A skilled, unscrupulous, and ambitious politician, an alliance allowed Caesar to harness Pompey's influence with the urban electorate. With additional support from Crassus, Caesar became one of the two consuls for 59 BC, the other being the optimate Marcus Calpurnius Bibulus. This meant Caesar could help pass legislation sponsored by Pompey and Crassus, while it was in his interest to keep them aligned, an important factor given the rivalry between his two patrons.

Despite appearing to be the most junior, Caesar thus became central to the First Triumvirate, an informal political alliance designed to counter-balance the optimates. Pompey's influence was based on his reputation as a military commander, and popularity with the Roman people. Crassus' wealth allowed him to construct extensive patronage networks, but he lacked the military clout essential for political success in the late Republican era.

Once elected, Caesar secured the passage of a new agrarian bill, helped by Pompey's veterans, who filled the streets of Rome and allegedly intimidated the Senate. When Bibulus opposed the measure, he was attacked in the forum, and spent the rest of his consulship under virtual house arrest. Caesar then ensured ratification of Pompey's settlements in the east, while the Lex Vatinia made him governor of Gallia Cisalpina and Illyricum. He was also assigned Gallia Transalpina after its governor died in office, before leaving Rome to launch the Gallic Wars in 58 BC. His alliance with Pompey was strengthened when the latter married Caesar's daughter Julia.

Senatorial opposition to the triumvirate was led by Cicero, a long-standing Pompeian ally. Despite this, the latter supported the populist politician Publius Clodius Pulcher in an attack on Cicero for executing Roman citizens without trial during the Catilinarian conspiracy. Although Clodius succeeded in having Cicero exiled, he was recalled to Rome by Pompey eighteen months later in 58 BC. As a result, when shortages of grain caused popular unrest in 57 BC, a grateful Cicero backed Pompey's appointment as praefectus annonae, a temporary position set up for such occasions.

Pompey and Crassus were competing for command of a new expedition to Asia Minor, and in 56 BC they met with Caesar to resolve these issues. Although Crassus was a long-standing rival, there are also indications Pompey felt his status as the foremost soldier of the Republic was threatened by Caesar's success in Gaul. With this in mind, Pompey set aside his differences with Crassus to promote their joint candidature as consuls for 55 BC. With Caesar's support, they were duly elected after prolonged periods of the violence which had become a feature of Roman political campaigns.  

Once in office, they ensured passage of a law giving Crassus the province of Syria and command of a punitive expedition against Parthia, providing him opportunities for both military glory and loot. Pompey was assigned the restive provinces of Hispania, along with Africa, while Caesar's governorships in Gaul were extended. All three men were given these positions for a period of five years, as well as the right to levy troops and "make peace and war with whomsoever they pleased."

From confrontation to civil war

In 54 BC, Caesar continued his conquest of Gaul, Crassus opened his campaign against the Parthians, and Pompey remained in Rome, where his wife Julia died in child birth in September. Contemporary sources suggest that combined with the death of Crassus and his son Publius at Carrhae in May 53 BC, this removed any obstacle to direct confrontation between Caesar and Pompey.  

The consular elections in 52 BC had to be suspended due to widespread violence. In a sign of shifting allegiances, the optimate Bibulus now proposed Pompey be elected sole consul, an unprecedented act backed by both Cato and the tribunate. Having restored order, Pompey married Cornelia, widow of Publius Crassus and daughter of Metellus Scipio Nasica, whom he appointed as his colleague for the last five months of the year.  

As consul, Pompey helped enact legislation which some historians view as crucial to understanding the drift to war in 49 BC. Accused of using violence during his consulship in 59 BC, Caesar had previously been shielded by his proconsular immunity. With private support from Pompey, new laws made such prosecutions retrospective, which meant Caesar would probably be put on trial the moment he left Gaul and lost his Imperium. To avoid this, he had secured approval to stand for the consulship in 48 BC while still in Gaul, but another law backed by Pompey required electoral candidates to be physically present in Rome.  

Although the two continued to co-operate in public, Pompey increasingly viewed his colleague as a threat, as did much of the Senate. Both of the consuls elected for 50 BC, Paullus and Marcellus, were opponents of Caesar, as was Curio, a plebeian tribune. They initiated legislation to remove Caesar from his command in Gaul, who allegedly bypassed this by bribing Paullus and Curio. For whatever reason, Curio proposed that both Caesar and Pompey should disarm at the same time, or be declared enemies of the state. 

This was a clever move, since it was popular with moderates who wanted to avoid war, but unacceptable to the optimates. Its rejection made open conflict more likely, and the Senate agreed to fund additional troops. When Pompey fell ill while recruiting in Naples, the celebrations that followed his recovery allegedly convinced him that his popularity was sufficient to see off any opponent. With the Republic sliding towards war, Caesar crossed the Alps with a single veteran legion and arrived at Ravenna, close to the border with Italy. 

Caesar was clearly convinced appearing in Rome without troops or the protection of a consulship risked political oblivion, or even execution. A significant number of senators were implacably opposed to any concessions and rejected a second offer from Caesar that he and Pompey simultaneously disband their troops. Both sides mistrusted Pompey, who has been criticised for "weak and ineffectual leadership" in this period. On 1 January 49 BC, Caesar sent an ultimatum stating that either his compromise was accepted, or he would march on Rome "to avenge his country's wrongs". With his single legion facing an army led by the two consuls for 49 BC, Marcellus and Crus, and Pompey recruiting in Campania, on 7 January the Senate declared him a public enemy. Four days later, Caesar crossed the Rubicon into Italy.

The Road to Pharsalus

When the war began, Caesar was a rebel with no navy and three understrength legions, while Pompey was backed by all the resources of the Roman state and his clients in the East. However, his position was weaker than it seemed, since he was simply an advisor to the Senate, many of whose members either preferred a negotiated solution, or regarded him with as much suspicion as Caesar. His military strategy had to be approved by the consuls, and he could only issue recommendations, which were not always followed. For example, Cicero rejected a request to help him with recruitment, and Cato refused to take command of Sicily, vital for control of Rome's grain supply. 

     

Plans to defend Italy were undone by the speed with which Caesar moved, advancing directly on Rome with minimal resistance. Although outnumbered, his troops were experienced veterans, while many of Pompey's were new recruits, a weakness made worse by lack of co-ordination. Cato's brother-in-law, the optimate leader Lucius Domitius, was cut off and captured in a hopeless defence of Corfinium, and his 13,000 men incorporated into Caesar's army. Led by Asinius Pollio, they were later used to occupy Sicily.

Pompey had abandoned Rome, ordering all senators and public officials to accompany him as he withdrew south to Brundisium. From there, he transported his troops across the Adriatic to Dyrrhachium in Thessaly, an operation performed with almost complete success. Caesar could not pursue him without ships, so first secured his rear by subduing Pompeian forces in Hispania, before returning to Rome in December 49 BC. This gave Pompey time to train recruits provided by his local allies, creating an army that outnumbered his opponent by nearly two to one. Meanwhile, his navy under Bibulus destroyed two fleets being built for Caesar, ensuring the Pompeians retained control of the sea lanes.         

Despite this, in January 48 BC Caesar managed to evade his patrols, cross the Adriatic and land in what is now southern Albania. After capturing Oricum and Apollonia, he advanced on Pompey's main supply base at Dyrrhachium. The latter arrived in time to block the attempt, and establish a fortified camp on the other side of the River Apus, where the two armies remained until spring. Neither commander was anxious to begin hostilities, since Caesar was too weak militarily, while as with Mithridates, Pompey preferred to starve his opponent into submission.  

   

In April, reinforcements under Mark Antony reached Caesar, but he still lacked the siege equipment needed to take Dyrrhachium, and could risk leaving Pompey in his rear. Although the latter had enough food, water was scarce because Caesar had dammed the local rivers, and the Pompeian cavalry lacked forage for their horses. Ending the stalemate became a matter of urgency, and after a series of unsuccessful assaults, in late July Pompey managed to break through part of Caesar's defensive lines. Since this made the blockade pointless, Caesar cut his losses and withdrew to Apollonia.

At this point, reinforcements from Syria arrived in Thesssaly led by Pompey's subordinate Metellus Scipio. Caesar moved south to confront this threat and link up with his deputy Gnaeus Domitius Calvinus, allowing his men to sack Gomphi en route. Pursued by Pompey, he then withdrew to the area near Pharsalus, but failed to tempt Pompey into giving battle. Although it was later claimed Pompey only did so after being pressured by his subordinates, the delay may simply have been a reflection of his natural caution.

Regardless, Pompey's army of around 38,000 outnumbered the 22,000 men commanded by Caesar, with 7,000 cavalry to 1,000. On 9 August he deployed his men in battle formation, planning to use his superior cavalry to outflank his opponent on his left. Caesar had anticipated this, and repulsed the cavalry which fled in confusion, exposing the infantry behind them. Under pressure from the left and in front, the Pompeian army collapsed.

Death

Caesar pursued Pompey to prevent him from gathering other forces to renew the war. Pompey had stopped at Amphipolis, where he held a meeting with friends to collect money. An edict was issued in his name that all the youth of the province of Macedonia (i.e. Greece), whether Greeks or Romans, were to take an oath. It was not clear whether Pompey wanted new levies to fight or whether this was concealment of a planned escape.

When he heard that Caesar was approaching, Pompey left and went to Mytilene, on the island of Lesbos, to take on board his wife Cornelia and his son. Pompey then set sail and stopped over only when he needed to get food or water. He reached Attaleia (Antalya) in Pamphylia, where some warships from Cilicia had been assembled for him. There, Pompey heard that Cato the Younger was sailing to Africa. Pompey blamed himself for not having used his superior navy and not having stationed at a place where he could have had naval backup if he had been defeated on land instead of fighting far from the coast. He asked the cities in the area for money to man his ships and looked for a temporary refuge in case the enemy caught up with him.

According to Plutarch, Pompey considered going to Parthia, but was advised Parthia's king, Arsaces, was untrustworthy and the place unsafe for Pompey's wife. This last point put Pompey off. He was advised to go instead to Egypt, which was only three days' sail away, and whose king, Ptolemy XIII, although only a boy, was indebted by the friendship and the help Pompey had given to his father, Ptolemy XII.

According to Caesar, Pompey went from Mytilene to Cilicia and Cyprus. There, he learned that the inhabitants of Antioch and the Romans resident there had taken up arms to prevent him from going there. The same action had been taken in Rhodes against Lucius Cornelius Lentulus Crus, the consul of the previous year, and Publius Lentulus, an ex-consul, who were also escaping. They reached the island and were barred from the port, with the islanders having been informed that Caesar was approaching. Pompey gave up on going to Syria. He took funds from the tax collectors, borrowed money to hire soldiers, and armed 2,000 men. He boarded a ship with many bronze coins.

Pompey set sail from Cyprus with warships and merchant ships. He heard that Ptolemy was in Pelusium with an army and that he was at war with his sister Cleopatra VII, whom he had deposed. The camps of the opposing forces were close, thus Pompey sent a messenger to announce his arrival to Ptolemy and to request his aid.

Potheinus the eunuch, who was the boy king's regent, held a council with Theodotus of Chios, the king's tutor and Achillas, the head of the army, amongst others. According to Plutarch, some advised driving Pompey away, and others welcoming him. Theodotus argued that neither option was safe: if welcomed, Pompey would become a master and Caesar an enemy, while, if turned away, Pompey would blame the Egyptians for rejecting him and Caesar for making him continue his pursuit. Instead, assassinating Pompey would eliminate fear of him and gratify Caesar.

Caesar thought this was decided because Ptolemy's forces included many of Pompey's soldiers who had been taken to Alexandria from Syria by Aulus Gabinius to restore Ptolemy XII when he had been deposed. These soldiers had subsequently remained in Egypt as part of the Ptolemaic army. Caesar therefore assumed that the king's advisors had decided to murder Pompey in case he tried to manipulate the Roman contingent of the Egyptian forces, in order to seize power.

On 28 September, Achillas went to Pompey's ship on a fishing boat together with Lucius Septimius, who had once been one of Pompey's officers, and a third assassin, Savius. Pompey's associates saw this lack of pomp with suspicion, and advised Pompey to put back out to open sea, out of reach of the Egyptians' missiles. Achillas claimed that the sea's sandy bottom and shallows had not allowed him to approach with a ship. However, the royal ships were seen taking crews on board, and there were soldiers on the shore.

Cornelia thought Pompey was going to be killed, but he boarded the boat. The lack of friendliness on the boat prompted Pompey to tell Septimius that he was an old comrade, the latter merely nodding. He thrust a sword into Pompey, and then Achillas and Savius stabbed him with daggers. The people on Pompey's ship could see this and, horrified, fled. Because the wind was favorable, the Egyptians did not pursue them.

Pompey's head was severed, and his unclothed body was thrown into the sea. Philip, one of Pompey's freedmen who had boarded the boat, wrapped it with his tunic and made a funeral pyre on the shore. Pompey died the day before his 58th birthday.

When Caesar arrived in Egypt a few days later, he was appalled. He turned away, loathing the man who brought Pompey's head. When Caesar was given Pompey's seal ring, he cried. Theodotus left Egypt and escaped Caesar's revenge. Pompey's remains were taken to Cornelia, who gave them burial at his Alban villa.

Generalship
Pompey's military glory was second to none for two decades, yet his skills were occasionally criticized by some of his contemporaries. Sertorius or Lucullus, for instance, were especially critical. Pompey's tactics were usually efficient, albeit not particularly innovative or imaginative, and they could prove insufficient against greater tacticians. However, Pharsalus was his only decisive defeat. At times, he was reluctant to risk an open battle. While not extremely charismatic, Pompey could display tremendous bravery and fighting skills on the battlefield, which inspired his men. While being a superb commander, Pompey also earned a reputation for stealing other generals' victories.

On the other hand, Pompey is usually considered an outstanding strategist and organizer, who could win campaigns without displaying genius on the battlefield, but simply by constantly outmaneuvering his opponents and gradually pushing them into a desperate situation. Pompey was a great forward planner, and had tremendous organizational skill, which allowed him to devise grand strategies and operate effectively with large armies. During his campaigns in the east, he relentlessly pursued his enemies, choosing the ground for his battles.

Above all, he was often able to adapt to his enemies. On many occasions, he acted very swiftly and decisively, as he did during his campaigns in Sicily and Africa, or against the Cilician pirates. During the Sertorian war, on the other hand, Pompey was beaten several times by Sertorius. Therefore, he decided to resort to a war of attrition, in which he would avoid open battles against his chief opponent but instead try to gradually regain the strategic advantage by capturing his fortresses and cities and defeating his junior officers. In some instances, Sertorius showed up and forced Pompey to abandon a siege, only to see him strike somewhere else. This strategy was not spectacular, but it led to constant territorial gains and did much to demoralize the Sertorian forces. By 72 BC, the year of his assassination, Sertorius was already in a desperate situation and his troops were deserting. Against Perpenna, a tactician far inferior to his former commander-in-chief, Pompey decided to revert to a more aggressive strategy and he scored a decisive victory that effectively ended the war.

Against Caesar too, his strategy was sound. During the campaign in Greece, he managed to regain the initiative, join his forces to that of Metellus Scipio (something that Caesar wanted to avoid) and trap his enemy. His strategic position was hence much better than that of Caesar and he could have starved Caesar's army to death. However, he was finally compelled to fight an open battle by his allies, and his conventional tactics proved no match to those of Caesar (who also commanded the more experienced troops).

Later portrayals and reputation

For the historians of his own and later Roman periods, Pompey fit the trope of the great man who achieved extraordinary triumphs through his own efforts, yet fell from power and was, in the end, murdered through treachery.

He was a hero of the Republic, who once seemed to hold the Roman world in his palm, only to be brought low by Caesar. Pompey was idealized as a tragic hero almost immediately after Pharsalus and his murder.

Plutarch portrayed Pompey as a Roman Alexander the Great, pure of heart and mind, destroyed by the cynical ambitions of those around him. This portrayal of him survived into the Renaissance and Baroque periods, for example, in Pierre Corneille's play The Death of Pompey (1642).

Despite his war against Caesar, Pompey was still widely celebrated during the imperial period as the conqueror of the Orient. For example, pictures of Pompey were carried at Augustus' funeral procession. And, as a triumphator, he had numerous statues in Rome, one of which was on the forum of Augustus. Although the imperial power did not honour Pompey as much as it did his arch enemy, who was considered a god, his reputation among many aristocrats and historians was equal, or even superior, to that of Caesar.

In popular culture

Comics 
Pompey makes a guest appearance in the French comic book Asterix and the Actress.
Pompey appears as Julius Caesar's foe throughout the Adventures of Alix series.

Films and theater 
 A theatrical portrayal of his life was John Masefield's play The Tragedy of Pompey the Great (1910).
 In the opening scene of the film King of Kings (1961), he is played by actor Conrado San Martín.

Literature 
 William Shakespeare's Measure for Measure includes a bawd named Pompey Bum, who is humorously compared with his Roman namesake across the play: his backside being the "greatest thing" about him, he is, Escalus comments, "in the beastliest sense [...] Pompey the Great", whilst Lucio, following Pompey's arrest "for being a bawd", likens his detention to the Roman general: "How now, noble Pompey! What, at the wheels of Caesar? Art thou led in triumph?" 
 In Colleen McCullough's Masters of Rome series of historical novels, Pompey's youthful exploits are depicted in Fortune's Favourites, the formation of the First Triumvirate and his marriage to Julia is a large part of Caesar's Women and his loss of Julia, the dissolution of the First Triumvirate, his later political career, the civil war between him and Caesar and his eventual defeat, leading to his betrayal and murder in Egypt, are all told in Caesar.
 Pompey is a recurring character in the Roma Sub Rosa series of novels by Steven Saylor, portraying his role in the civil war with Caesar. His final appearance is in Saylor's novel The Judgment of Caesar, which depicts his murder by Ptolemy in Egypt.
 Pompey is a major recurring character in Robert Harris' trilogy of the life of Cicero (Imperium, Lustrum and Dictator), in which Pompey is portrayed as bombastic and dim-witted, though fearsome.

Television 
 In the television series Xena: Warrior Princess, he is portrayed by actor Jeremy Callaghan.
 Chris Noth portrays Pompey in the miniseries Julius Caesar (2002).
 He appears as a major character in the season 1 of the HBO series Rome, portrayed by Kenneth Cranham.
 He was played by John Shrapnel in the BBC One docudrama series, Ancient Rome: The Rise and Fall of an Empire (2006).
 In the television series Spartacus: War of the Damned, he is portrayed by actor Joel Tobeck.
 He appears in the Netflix series Roman Empire,  played by Stephen Lovatt.

Chronology of Pompey's life and career
 29 September 106 BC – Born in Picenum;
 89 BC – Serves under his father at Asculum (during the Social War);
 83 BC – Aligns with Sulla, after his return from the First Mithridatic War against King Mithridates VI of Pontus, raising a legion and cavalry in hopes of joining him;
 82 BC – Marriage to Aemilia at the behest of Sulla, but Aemilia is already pregnant and eventually dies during childbirth;
 82–81 BC – Defeats Gaius Marius' allies in Sicily and Africa;
 81 BC – Returns to Rome and celebrates first triumph;
 80 BC – Pompey marries Mucia Tertia, of the Mucii Scaevolae family;
 79 BC – Pompey supports the election of Marcus Aemilius Lepidus, who openly revolts against the Senate a few months later. Pompey suppresses the rebellion with an army raised from Picenum and puts down the rebellion, killing the rebel Marcus Junius Brutus, father of Brutus, who would go on to assassinate Julius Caesar;
 76–71 BC – Campaign in Hispania against Sertorius;
 71 BC – Returns to Italy and participates in the suppression of a slave rebellion led by Spartacus, obtaining his second triumph;
 70 BC – First consulship (with Marcus Licinius Crassus);
 67 BC – Defeats the pirates and goes to the province of Asia;
 66–61 BC – Defeats King Mithridates of Pontus, ending the Third Mithridatic War;
 64–63 BC – Marches through Syria, the Levant, and Judea;
 29 September 61 BC – Third triumph;
 April 59 BC – The first triumvirate is constituted. Pompey allies with Julius Caesar and Crassus, marrying Caesar's daughter Julia (wife of Pompey);
 58–55 BC – Governs Hispania Ulterior by proxy, while the Theater of Pompey is constructed;
 55 BC – Second consulship (with Marcus Licinius Crassus), and the Theater of Pompey is finally inaugurated;
 54 BC – Julia dies, and the first triumvirate ends;
 52 BC – Serves as sole consul for an intercalary month, but has a third ordinary consulship with Metellus Scipio for the rest of the year, marrying his daughter Cornelia Metella;
 51 BC – Forbids Caesar (in Gaul) to stand for consulship in absentia;
 50 BC – Falls dangerously ill with fever in Campania, but is saved "by public prayers";
 49 BC – Caesar crosses the Rubicon river and invades Italy, while Pompey retreats to Greece with the conservatives;
 48 BC – Caesar defeats Pompey's army near Pharsalus, Greece. Pompey retreats to Egypt and is killed at Pelusium.

Footnotes

References

Sources

Bibliography
 Appian. (1996) The Civil Wars, Book 2. Penguin Classics. New edition.  Book 2  Accessed August 2016
 Appian. (2014). The Foreign Wars, Book 12, The Mithridatic Wars. CreateSpace Independent Publishing Platform.   Accessed August 2016
 Julius Caesar. (1976). The Civil War: Together with the Alexandrian War, the African War, and the Spanish War. Penguin Classics. New impression edition.   Accessed August 2016
 Cassius Dio. (1989). Roman History. Volume 3, Books 36–40. (Loeb Classical Library) Loeb New issue of 1916 edition. ; Vol. 4, Books 41–45, .  Books 36–41. Accessed August 2016
 Josephus. (2014). The Antiquities of the Jews: Volume II (Books XI–XX). CreateSpace Independent Publishing Platform; First edition.   Accessed August 2016 Parallel Lives, Life of Pompey Accessed August 2016

Secondary sources
 Abbott, F., History and Description of Roman Political Institutions, Adamant Media Corporation, 2001; 
 Brice, Lee L., Warfare in the Roman Republic: From the Etruscan Wars to the Battle of Actium, ABC-CLIO, 2014; 
 
 De Souza, P., Piracy in the Graeco-Roman World, Cambridge University Press, 2002; 
 Hillman, T., P., The Reputation of Cn. Pompeius Magnus among His Contemporaries from 83 to 59 B.C., Diss. New York 1989. 
 Haley, Shelley P., 'The Five Wives of Pompey the Great', Greece and Rome 32.1, 49–59.
 Nicols, Marianne Schoenlin. Appearance and Reality. A Study of the Clientele of Pompey the Great, Diss. Berkeley/Cal. 1992.
 Sampson, Gareth, The Collapse of Rome: Marius, Sulla and the First Civil War, Pen and Sword Military, 2013; 
 Southern, P., Pompey the Great: Caesar's Friend and Foe, The History Press, 2003; 
 Stockton, D., The First Consulship of Pompey, Historia 22 (1973), 205–18.
 Tröster, Manuel. Roman Hegemony and Non-State Violence. A Fresh Look at Pompey's Campaign against the Pirates, Greece & Rome 56 (2009), 14–33.
 Van Ooteghem, J., Pompée le Grand. Bâtisseur d’Empire. Brussels 1954.
 Wylie, G., J., Pompey Megalopsychos, Klio 72 (1990), 445–456.

 
106 BC births
48 BC deaths
1st-century BC Roman augurs
1st-century BC Roman consuls
1st-century BC Roman generals
People involved in anti-piracy efforts
Assassinated Roman politicians
Correspondents of Cicero
Deaths by stabbing in Egypt
First Triumvirate
Julius Caesar
Male murder victims
People from le Marche
People murdered in Egypt
Pompeii (Romans)
Roman governors of Hispania
Supporters of Sulla